Scott Michael Cousins (born January 22, 1985) is an American former professional baseball outfielder. He played in Major League Baseball for the Florida / Miami Marlins and Los Angeles Angels of Anaheim from 2010 through 2013.

Amateur career
Cousins, at 6'1" and 197 lbs, attended North Valleys High School in Reno, Nevada ('03) where he was a standout in both baseball and basketball.

As a sophomore at the University of San Francisco in 2005, Cousins batted .309 with 30 RBIs, 13 stolen bases, and 7 home runs.  On the mound, he went 8–5 with a 2.64 ERA and 76 strikeouts.

In 2006, as a junior, Cousins hit .343 with 46 RBIs, 21 stolen bases, and 7 home runs for the Dons.  He also won 4 games striking out 61 batters. For his performance, Cousins was named a first-team All-American and the 2006 West Coast Conference Player of the Year.  Cousins' play helped the Dons win their first WCC title and make an inaugural trip to the NCAA Regionals.

Professional career

Florida / Miami Marlins
Cousins was drafted by the Marlins in the third round of the 2006 Major League Baseball Draft.

In 2007, for Class A Greensboro (SAL), Cousins hit .292 with 18 home runs, 74 RBIs, and 16 stolen bases.  He earned "MiLB.com Class A Best Single-Game Performer honors when he slugged three home runs and drove in a career-high nine RBIs on Aug. 22 against Hickory ... stroked a game-tying two-run homer, launched a grand slam, the first of his career, an inning later, and finished his day with a three-run drive in the eighth."

In 2008, as a member of the Mesa Solar Sox, Cousins led the Arizona Fall League in RBIs with 33 and hit .297 with 6 home runs. In 2009 for the Jacksonville Suns, Cousins batted .263 with 74 RBIs, 12 home runs, 27 stolen bases, and led all AA with 11 triples (also setting a Marlins' minor league record). Cousins was added to the Marlins' 40 man roster following the 2009 season to protect him from the Rule 5 draft.

Cousins hit .285 with 14 home runs, 49 RBIs, and 12 stolen bases for the New Orleans Zephyrs in the Class AAA Pacific Coast League before being called up to the major leagues on September 2, 2010. Cousins recorded his first hit, a walk-off single, against the Atlanta Braves on September 5, 2010. Regarding Cousins' call up, USF head coach Nino Giarratano stated, "Academically, athletically and personally he is most deserving of the opportunity and a lifetime of opportunities in Major League Baseball."

On September 24 and 25, Scott Cousins became the first major leaguer since Willie McGee in 1982 to record back-to-back pinch hit triples when he hit three baggers against the Brewers at Miller Park. On April 21, 2011, Cousins hit his first career home run, a grand slam off James McDonald of the Pittsburgh Pirates.

On May 25, 2011, during a game against the San Francisco Giants, Cousins collided with catcher Buster Posey at home plate after tagging up from third base on a sacrifice fly from Emilio Bonifacio. Posey sustained a broken fibula and three torn ligaments in his left ankle, causing him to miss the rest of the season. Cousins said he hit Posey on purpose so that he could score. "If you go in first feet and slide they punish you. If you hit them, you punish them and you punish yourself, but you have a chance of that ball coming out." While Cousins maintained that he did not intend to injure Posey, many others disagreed, and argued that Cousins hit Posey with the intention of hurting him. This collision led to MLB and the Major League Baseball Players Association to agree to a new rule intended to limit home plate collisions.

On June 15, 2012, Cousins was called up to the majors. Two days later, on June 17, Cousins made his first start as a Marlin since being called up. He went 3 for 7 against the Tampa Bay Rays, including a game-winning RBI triple in the 15th inning.

Toronto Blue Jays
On October 17, 2012, Cousins was claimed on waivers by the Toronto Blue Jays after being designated for assignment by the Marlins.

Seattle Mariners
On November 1, Cousins was designated for assignment by the Blue Jays and was claimed off waivers by the Seattle Mariners 5 days later. On November 20, The Mariners designated him for assignment.

Los Angeles Angels
The Los Angeles Angels of Anaheim claimed Cousins on November 30, 2012. He was designated for assignment on May 18, 2013. He was later re-signed and sent to Salt Lake. With two teams that minor league season, Cousins hit .242, with 3 doubles, 5 triples, 1 home run, and 19 RBIs to go along with 6 stolen bases.

Texas Rangers
Cousins signed a minor league deal with the Boston Red Sox in January 2014. He was released on March 29, 2014. On April 16, 2014, Cousins signed a minor league contract with the Texas Rangers.

Retirement
Cousins signed with the Somerset Patriots for the 2015 season. Cousins then retired on July 7, 2015.

Post-playing career
In , Cousins became an area scout based in Scottsdale, Arizona, for the Oakland Athletics.

References

External links

1985 births
Living people
Arizona League Angels players
Baseball players from Nevada
Carolina Mudcats players
Florida Marlins players
Greensboro Grasshoppers players
Gulf Coast Marlins players
Jacksonville Suns players
Jamestown Jammers players
Jupiter Hammerheads players
Los Angeles Angels players
Major League Baseball outfielders
Mesa Solar Sox players
Miami Marlins players
New Orleans Zephyrs players
Oakland Athletics scouts
Sportspeople from Sparks, Nevada
Salt Lake Bees players
San Francisco Dons baseball players
Somerset Patriots players
North Valleys High School alumni